However is the 12th single release by Japanese band Glay on August 6, 1997. It debuted at #1 on the Oricon chart, appearing at that position for 5 weeks in total, selling 1,341,980 copies.

The title song was used as the ending song for the TV drama  aired on TBS channel, whose opening theme was another Glay song, "Freeze My Love", and all the music was instrumental versions of Glay's songs.

Awards
Grand Prize winner at the "30th Japan Cable Broadcast Awards"
39th Annual Japan Record Awards "Excellent work prize"

Covers by other musicians
"However" has been recorded by Kiyoshi Maekawa in his album Ballad Selection, in 1999, and by Ayumi Nakamura in her album Voice, in 2008. Debbie Gibson recorded an English-language cover of the song in her 2010 Japan-only release Ms. Vocalist.

Track list
However
I'm Yours

References

1997 singles
Glay songs
Oricon Weekly number-one singles
Japanese television drama theme songs
1997 songs